Johan Ernst Hartmann  (2 March 1770 – 16 December 1844) was a Danish organist and composer, and son of composer and violinist Johann Hartmann. In 1795 he started as an organist at Frederik's German Church in Christianshavn and in 1807 he became cantor at Roskilde Cathedral. Some of his compositions, including cantatas, were performed in the years 1789-97. At Roskilde, he established a renowned choir for which he composed various works .

He died on 16 December 1844. His son, Søren Hartmann (1815-1912) became his successor as cantor at Roskilde Cathedral, where he also stayed for 40 years until 1883.

See also
List of Danish composers

References
This article was initially translated from the Danish Wikipedia.

Danish classical organists
Male classical organists
Danish composers
Male composers
Hartmann family
1770 births
1844 deaths